Codex Ambrosianus 435 is one of the most important manuscripts of the treatise On the Soul by Aristotle. It is designated by the symbol U. Paleographically it had been assigned to the 12th or 13th century. It is written in Greek minuscule letters. The manuscript contains the complete text of the treatise. It belongs to the textual family ν, together with the manuscripts v Ud Ad U Q. 

The manuscript is one of nine manuscripts that was cited by Trendelenburg, Torstrik, Biehl, Apelt, and one of five cited by Ross in their critical editions of the treatise On the Soul. Currently it is housed at the Biblioteca Ambrosiana (435 (H. 50)) in Milan.

Other manuscripts 

 Codex Vaticanus 253
 Codex Vaticanus 266
 Codex Coislinianus 386
 Codex Ambrosianus 837

Further reading 

 Paweł Siwek, Aristotelis tractatus De anima graece et latine, Desclée, Romae 1965. 

12th-century manuscripts
Aristotelian manuscripts
Manuscripts of the Ambrosiana collections